The 2008 Basingstoke and Deane Council election took place on 1 May 2008 to elect members of Basingstoke and Deane Borough Council in Hampshire, England. The whole council was up for election with boundary changes since the 2007 election. The Conservative Party gained overall control of the council from no overall control.

Background
After the last election in 2007 the Conservatives had a majority on the council with 31 of the 60 seats. However the Conservatives would lose their majority after defeat by the Liberal Democrats in a by-election in Baughurst in January 2008 left the Conservatives with exactly half o the seats.

The whole council was contested in 2008 instead of the usual third, after changes were made to the boundaries. The changes included abolishing Calleva ward and creating a Bramley and Sherfield ward. Tadley North was split in two, Burghclere was merged with Highclere and St Mary Bourne and the number of seats in Winklebury ward was reduced by one.

Councillors standing down at the election included Gwen Richardson and Erica Shaw, while former Labour group leader David Potter and the former Conservative council leader from the 1980s and 1990s, Stephen Reid, attempted to return to the council. Meanwhile, Independent councillor David Leeks, stood for the Conservatives after joining the party.

Election result
The results saw the Conservatives gain a 10-seat majority on the council after winning 35 of the 60 seats. This was compared to 14 Liberal Democrat, 9 Labour and 2 independent councillors. Among those defeated in the election was the leader of the Labour group on the council, Gary Watts, who lost in South Ham and the mayor Warwick Lovegrove. The former leader of the council Stephen Reid returned to the council in Buckskin, defeating a former mayor Tony Jones. Overall turnout in the election was 37%.

Following the election Conservative Andrew Finney became the new leader of the council succeeding John Leek.

Ward results

References

2008
2008 English local elections
2000s in Hampshire